Francesco, the Italian (and original) version of the personal name "Francis", is the most common given name among males in Italy. Notable persons with that name include:

People with the given name Francesco

 Francesco I (disambiguation), several people
 Francesco Barbaro (disambiguation), several people
 Francesco Bernardi (disambiguation), several people
Francesco di Giorgio Martini (1439-1501), Italian architect, engineer and painter
 Francesco Berni (1497–1536), Italian writer
 Francesco Canova da Milano (1497–1543), Italian lutenist and composer
 Francesco Primaticcio (1504–1570), Italian painter, architect, and sculptor
 Francesco Albani (1578–1660), Italian painter
 Francesco Borromini (1599–1667), Swiss sculptor and architect
 Francesco Cavalli (1602–1676), Italian composer
 Francesco Maria Grimaldi (1618–1663), Italian mathematician and physicist
 Francesco Bianchini (1662–1729), Italian philosopher and scientist
 Francesco Galli Bibiena (1659–1739), Italian architect and designer
 Francesco Antonio Bonporti (1672–1749), Italian priest and composer
 Francesco Scipione, marchese di Maffei (1675–1755), Italian archaeologist
 Francesco Manfredini (1684–1762), Italian composer
 Francesco Geminiani (1687–1762), Italian violinist and composer
 Francesco Maria Veracini (1690–1768), Italian composer
 Francesco Zuccarelli (1702–1788), Italian painter
 Francesco Zahra (1710–1773), Maltese painter
 Francesco Algarotti (1712–1764), Italian philosopher
 Francesco Guardi (1712–1793), Italian artist
 Francesco Antonio Zaccaria (1714–1795), Italian theologian and historian
 Francesco Cetti (1726–1778), Italian Jesuit scientist
 Francesco Hayez (1791–1882), Italian painter
 Francesco Puccinotti (1794–1872), Italian pathologist
 Francesco Ticciati (1893–1949), Italian musician
 Francesco Greco (1942–2018), Italian lawyer and politician
 Francesco Rosi (1922–2015), Italian film maker
 Francesco Merloni (born 1925), Italian industrialist, academic and politician
 Francesco Ricci Bitti (born 1942), Italian sports official
 Francesco Beschi (born 1951), Italian bishop
 Francesco Moser (born 1951), Italian cyclist
 Franco Serantini (born 1951), Italian anarchist
 Francesco Schettino (born 1960), Italian former ship captain and prisoner
 Francesco da Mosto (born 1961), Italian architect, film maker and television presenter
 Francesco Attolico (born 1963), Italian water polo player
 Francesco Saverio Romano (born 1964), Italian politician and lawyer
 Francesco Bruno (born 1968), Italian sport shooter
 Francesco Lollobrigida (born 1972), Italian lawyer and politician
 Francesco Postiglione (born 1972), Italian swimmer and water polo player
 Francesco Totti (born 1976), Italian football player
 Francesco Bilotto (born 1977), American designer and entertainment expert 
 Francesco Cernuto (born 1992), Italian footballer

Characters with the given name 
 Francesco Bernoulli, character in the Disney-Pixar animated film Cars 2

See also

References 

Italian masculine given names
Sammarinese given names